Booty v. Barnaby is the name of an English court case in 1687, in which a Mrs Booty brought a suit for slander against her neighbour, Captain Barnaby, who claimed that he had seen her deceased husband being driven into Hell.

Events
On May 12, 1687, Captains Barnaby, Bristow and Brewer with Mr Ball, a merchant of Wentworth, went to go shooting on Stromboli, aboard the Spinks. Later, as they prepared to leave on the 15th, they saw two men running and Capt Barnaby cried out, "Lord bless me! the foremost man is Mr Booty my next door neighbour in London." He was in grey clothes with cloth buttons, and the man who was chasing him was dressed in black. They both ran into the mouth of the volcano and at instant there came a great noise. Capt Barnaby said "I do not doubt, but it is old Booty running into hell."

They arrived at Gravesend on October 6. After some discourse, Capt Barnaby's wife said "I can tell you some news, old Booty is dead." He answered, "that we all know: we all saw him run into hell." Mrs Barnaby related this to an acquaintance in London, who informed Mrs Booty of it. Mrs Booty was very much displeased and went to court about it. The Judge asked Mrs Booty what time her husband died. She told them and it agreed with the time in which the Captain and his crew saw him running.

She lost her suit, based on the statements of thirty witnesses who were there and their journals.

Distortions

The Idler published two illustrations concerning Mr. Booty by George Cruikshank in 1837.

A poem titled "Old booty! : A serio-comic sailor's tale." was published in 1830 by William Thomas Moncrieff.

Case details
In the records at Westminster, Court of King's Bench, Reign of James the Second, 1687

Sir Edward Herbert - Chief Justice
Wythens, Holloway and Wright, Justices
Defendant - Captain Barnaby
Complainant - Mrs. Booty

Resources

Notes

References

External links
 
 
 
 
 
 
  Original edition published 1879
 
 

 
 

Ghost stories
Trials in England
1687 in England
1687 in law
English tort case law
Hell